This is a timeline documenting the events of heavy metal in the year 1980.

Newly formed bands
35007
Agnostic Front
Alkatrazz
Anthem 
Balance
 Barón Rojo
 Battleaxe
 Bitch
 Black Rose
 Blitzkrieg
 Bulldozer
 Destiny
Die Krupps
Gene Loves Jezebel
 Grave Digger
 Heaven
 Holy Moses
Iron Angel
Joshua
 Killer
Kruiz
 Lionheart
Litfiba
Living Death 
 Los Suaves
 Maninnya Blade
 Manowar
 Metal Church
 More
  Ostrogoth
 Ozzy Osbourne (solo career)
 Overkill
Pokolgép
 Queensrÿche
 Riff
 The Rods
 Rok Mašina
 Sacred Rite
 Saint
 Sound Barrier
Starfighters 
 Stormwitch
 Suicidal Tendencies
 Syron Vanes
 Tank
 Turbo
Vanadium
 Vixen
Warlord 
 Warning
 White Sister
 Wrathchild

Albums & EPs

 AC/DC - Back in Black
 Accept - I'm a Rebel
 Aerosmith – Greatest Hits
 Alice Cooper - Flush the Fashion
 Angel Witch - Angel Witch
 Atomic Rooster – Atomic Rooster
 A II Z - The Witch of Berkeley (live)
 Beowulf - Slice of Life
 Blackfoot - Tomcattin'
 Black Sabbath - Heaven and Hell
 Blue Öyster Cult - Cultösaurus Erectus
 Bow Wow - Glorious Road
 Bow Wow - Telephone
 Budgie - If Swallowed, Do Not Induce Vomiting (EP)
 Budgie - Power Supply
 Chevy - The Taker
 Cirith Ungol - Frost and Fire
 Def Leppard - On Through the Night
 Diamond Head - Lightning to the Nations
 Ethel the Frog - Ethel the Frog
 Fargo - No Limit
 Fist (UK) - Turn the Hell On
 Fist (Can) - Hot Spikes
 Gamma - Gamma 2
 Gillan - Glory Road
 Girl - Sheer Greed
 Girlschool - Demolition
 Grand Prix - Grand Prix
 The Hunt - Back on the Hunt
 Iron Maiden - Iron Maiden
 Judas Priest - British Steel
 Killer (Bel) - Ready for Hell
 KISS - Unmasked
 Krokus - Metal Rendez-vous
 Limelight - Limelight
 Magnum - Marauder (live)
 Mama's Boys - Official Album
 Manilla Road - Invasion
 Metal for Muthas - (Compilation, various artists)
 Metal for Muthas - Volume II - Cut Loud - (Compilation, various artists)
 Muthas Pride - (Compilation, EP, various artists)
 Metal Explosion - From The Friday Rock Show - (Compilation, various artists)
 Frank Marino & Mahogany Rush - What's Next
 Michael Schenker Group - The Michael Schenker Group
 Molly Hatchet - Beatin' the Odds
 Gary Moore - G-Force
 Motörhead - Ace of Spades
 Mythra - Death & Destiny (EP)
 Ted Nugent - Scream Dream
 Ocean - "A" Live + B (side one is live)
 Ozzy Osbourne - Blizzard of Ozz
 Pat Benatar - Crimes of Passion
 Plasmatics - New Hope for the Wretched
 Quartz - Stand Up and Fight
 Rail - Arrival
 Reckless - Reckless
 The Rods - Rock Hard
 Rush - Permanent Waves
 Samson - Head On
 Saxon - Wheels of Steel
 Saxon - Strong Arm of the Law
 Schoolboys – Singin' Shoutin''' (EP)
 Scorpions - Animal Magnetism Shakin' Street - Shakin' Street Snow - Snow (EP)
 Speed Queen - Speed Queen Thin Lizzy - Chinatown Triumph - Progressions of Power Trust - Répression Tygers of Pan Tang - Wild Cat UFO - No Place to Run Van Halen - Women and Children First Vardis - 100 M.P.H. (live)
 Whitesnake - Ready an' Willing Whitesnake - Live...in the Heart of the City 
 White Spirit - White Spirit Wild Horses - Wild Horses, aka The First Album Wishbone Ash - Just Testing Witchfynde - Give 'Em Hell Witchfynde - StagefrightDisbandments
Led Zeppelin

Events
 Bon Scott, lead singer of AC/DC, dies at 33 on February 19 after a binge of heavy drinking.
 October: Iron Maiden comp guitarist Dennis Stratton leaves and is replaced by Adrian Smith.
 John Bonham, drummer for Led Zeppelin, dies at 32 on September 25, after a binge of heavy drinking. His death was similar to Bon Scott's, and caused Led Zeppelin to disband.
April: Brian Johnson joins AC/DC replacing Bon Scott as lead singer.
 May 18: Peter Criss, drummer of Kiss, leaves the band.  Eric Carr takes his place.
 Sounds Music Paper Editor Dave Lewis, invents the term New Wave Of British Heavy Metal'' to accompany an article Geoff Barton wrote on three young British Heavy Metal bands touring together, namely Samson, Iron Maiden and Angelwitch.

1980s in heavy metal music
Metal